Zero Theory, Zero Theorem, Zero Conjecture, Zero Law or similar, may mean:

 X&Y, Coldplay's third album, once rumoured to be titled Zero Theory
 The Zero Theorem, a science fiction film directed by Terry Gilliam

See also 
 List of zero terms